Amit Asawa (born 12 September 1963 in Indore, Madhya Pradesh) is an Indian first-class cricketer who plays for Rajasthan. He was head coach of Rajasthan when they emerged champions of the Ranji Trophy in 2010/11 and 2011/12 seasons.

References

External links
 

1963 births
Living people
Indian cricketers
Rajasthan cricketers
Indian cricket coaches
Cricketers from Indore